Ivo Indzhev (Bulgarian: Иво Инджев) is a Bulgarian journalist, blogger and former TV presenter. He is also an author of best-selling books - since 2009 he has published seven books in Bulgarian. As a journalist, Ivo Indzhev is one of the Bulgarians authors who are quoted regularly in foreign media, especially when discussing the relations between Russia and Bulgaria. He is the author of commentaries for Radio Free Europe and BBC. He is also a deputy chairman of the Ethics Commission in the electronic media – broadcasting in Bulgaria.

Biography

Education
Ivo Indzhev graduated history and Arabic language in Moscow and speaks four languages.

Professional career
1983 – 1987
Correspondent for BTA (Bulgarian Telegraph Agency, Sofia) in Beirut, Lebanon

1990 – 1993
Director general of BTA (Bulgarian Telegraph Agency, Sofia)

1993 – 1994
Editor in chief of the Bulgarian national daily newspaper “Express”

1994 – 1995
Editor in chief of the Bulgarian national daily newspaper “Demokratsia” (Democracy)

1994 – 1996
Vice president of the Association of European Journalists

1995 – 2000
Commentator and analyst at Radio Free Europe

2000 – 2006

Host of the TV Show “On Target” on bTV (Bulgarian Television, Balkan News Corporation)

2008 - today
Writing in his own blog http://ivo.bg/. He had nearly 3,000 posts and about 14 million views by the summer of 2013. In 2015, his blog had registered already 4,000 publications, 22 million viewers, and more than 100,000 comments.

TV Show “On Target” scandal
On 8 October 2006, in his to become last edition of the TV show "On Target", of which he was the anchor, Mr. Indzhev asked his guest about information he got by email. The email was about an apartment, which allegedly belonged to the President of the Republic Georgi Parvanov, who was running for re-election at that time. Couple of days later the contract between Ivo Indzhev and bTV was terminated, after bTV accused him of gross violation of journalistic ethics and basic principles of serious journalism. Mr. Indzhev said that bTV was a subject of pressure from the President's office for months, and the result was inevitable.

Awards
Awarded a certificate for most nominated person of the year at the 2009 Bulgarian Helsinki Committee
Annual awards for contribution to human rights

Books
(in Bulgarian)

References

External links 
Ivo Indzhev's blog
Ivo Indzhev autobiography

Bulgarian journalists
Bulgarian bloggers
1955 births
Living people